Heterocithara zebuensis is a species of sea snail, a marine gastropod mollusc in the family Mangeliidae.

Description
The length of the shell attains 6 mm. The light brown shell is longitudinally strongly ribbed, transversely obsoletely striated.

Distribution
This marine species occurs off Australia (Queensland) and off the Philippines.

References

 Reeve, L.A. 1846. Monograph of the genus Mangelia. pls 1–8 in Reeve, L.A. (ed). Conchologia Iconica. London : L. Reeve & Co. Vol. 3.
 Boettger, O. 1895. Die marinen Mollusken der Philippinen. IV. Die Pleurotomiden. Nachrichtsblatt der Deutschen Malakozooligischen Gesellschaft 27(1–2, 3–4): 1–20, 41–63

External links
  Tucker, J.K. 2004 Catalog of recent and fossil turrids (Mollusca: Gastropoda). Zootaxa 682:1–1295.
 
  Hedley, C. 1922. A revision of the Australian Turridae. Records of the Australian Museum 13(6): 213–359, pls 42–56 

zebuensis
Gastropods described in 1846